In Hinduism, Bhutamata is a terrible and malevolent goddess, a form of Devi.

Legends 
Bhutamata is mentioned in Kumarika khanda of Skanda Purana. She was born from lord Guha for save people from the ghosts.

References

Hindu goddesses